Zubák or Zubak is a surname. Notable people with this surname include:

Ethan Zubak (born 1998), American soccer player
 (born 1978), Croatian-Swedish film director, screenwriter and producer
Krešimir Zubak (born 1947), Bosnian Croat politician

See also

Zubák
Zubac